This article presents a list of the historical events and publications of Australian literature during 1897.

Books 

 Guy Boothby
 The Fascination of the King
 The Lust of Hate
 A Prince of Swindlers
 Sheilah McLeod: A Heroine of the Back Blocks
 Mary Gaunt – Kirkham's Find
 E. W. Hornung 
 My Lord Duke
 Young Blood
 Louise Mack – Teens: A Story of Australian School Girls
 Rosa Praed – Nulma
 Roderic Quinn – Mostyn Stayne

Short stories 

 Louis Becke – Pacific Tales
 Guy Boothby
 "One of the Cloth"
 "With Three Phantoms"
 Ada Cambridge – At Midnight and Other Stories
 Mary Gaunt – "The Lost White Woman: A Pioneer's Yarn"
 Henry Lawson 
 "Mr Smellingscheck"
 "Two Larrikins"
 A. B. Paterson – "Bill and Jim Nearly Get Taken Down"
 Rosa Praed — "Miss Crosson's Familiar"
 Steele Rudd 
 "Dave's Snake-Bite"
 "Jack or Cranky Jack"
 "A Kangaroo Hunt from Shingle Hut"
 "The Parson and the Scone"
 Price Warung – "The Spread-Eagling of Convict Cunliffe"

Poetry 

 Arthur A. D. Bayldon – Poems
 Barcroft Boake – Where the Dead Men Lie, and Other Poems
 E. J. Brady – "The Whaler's Pig"
 Christopher Brennan – XXI Poems 1893-1897: Towards the Source
 Victor J. Daley – "A Treat for the London Poor"
 J. Le Gay Brereton – Sweetheart Mine: Lyrics of Love and Friendship
 John Farrell – "Australia to England"
 W. T. Goodge
 "The Great Australian Adjective"
 "The Oozlum Bird"
 Henry Lawson 
 "The Lights of Cobb and Co."
 "The Old Bark School"
 Ethel Mills – "The Brumby's Death"
 Breaker Morant – "Who's Riding Old Harlequin Now?"
 Will H. Ogilvie – "The Stockyard Liar"
 A. B. Paterson 
 "The Ballad of the Calliope"
 "By the Grey Gulf-water"
 "Saltbush Bill's Second Fight"
 Charles Thatcher – "Look Out Below!"
 Ethel Turner – "Orphaned by the Sea"
 Dora Wilcox – "After the Floods"
 David McKee Wright – Station Ballads and Other Verses

Births 

A list, ordered by date of birth (and, if the date is either unspecified or repeated, ordered alphabetically by surname) of births in 1897 of Australian literary figures, authors of written works or literature-related individuals follows, including year of death.

 16 March – Flora Eldershaw, novelist (died 1956)
 9 April – Dale Collins, journalist and novelist (died 1956) 
 16 August – Marjorie Barnard, novelist (died 1987)

Unknown date
 Winifred Birkett, novelist and poet (died 1966)

Deaths 

A list, ordered by date of death (and, if the date is either unspecified or repeated, ordered alphabetically by surname) of deaths in 1897 of Australian literary figures, authors of written works or literature-related individuals follows, including year of birth.

 22 December – William Gay, poet (born 1865)

See also 
 1897 in poetry
 List of years in literature
 List of years in Australian literature
1897 in literature
1896 in Australian literature
1897 in Australia
1898 in Australian literature

References

Literature
Australian literature by year
19th-century Australian literature
1897 in literature